The 1958 Michigan gubernatorial election was held on November 4, 1958. Incumbent Democrat G. Mennen Williams defeated Republican nominee Paul Douglas Bagwell with 53% of the vote.

General election

Candidates
Major party candidates
G. Mennen Williams, Democratic 
Paul Douglas Bagwell, Republican

Other candidates
Ralph Muncy, Socialist Labor
Rollin M. Severance, Prohibition
Frank Lovell, Socialist Workers

Results

Primaries 
The primary elections occurred on August 5, 1958.

Democratic primary

Republican primary

References

1958
Michigan
Gubernatorial
November 1958 events in the United States